Tetsuji Isozaki (born April 7, 1969 in Tokyo) is a Japanese politician who has served as a member of the House of Councillors of Japan since 2013. He represents the National proportional representation block and is a member of the Democratic Party For the People.

References 

Members of the House of Councillors (Japan)
Living people
1969 births
Politicians from Tokyo